Palmetto Records is an independent American jazz record company and label in New York City founded in 1990 by guitarist Matt Balitsaris.

Issues began with those by Balitsaris, then Greg Hatza in 1993. Since then, its catalog has included albums by Peter Bernstein, Joel Frahm, Larry Goldings, Andrew Hill, Cecil McBee, Dewey Redman, and Matt Wilson.

Balitsaris retired from music and began working for Fonkoze, a charity in Haiti. He was chairman of the board until 2015.

Artists

Ben Allison
Lili Añel
Matt Balitsaris
David Berkman
Will Bernard
Betty Buckley
Joey Calderazzo
Frank Christian
Scott Colley
Richard Davis
Marty Ehrlich
Peter Eldridge
Sara Gazarek
Larry Goldings
Greg Hatza
Fred Hersch
Andrew Hill
Javon Jackson
Frank Kimbrough
Lee Konitz
Brian Landrus
Bill Mays
Cecil McBee
Leon Russell
Kate McGarry
Chris McNulty
Mustard's Retreat
Ted Nash
New York Voices
Noah Preminger
Bobby Previte
Dewey Redman
Lonnie Smith
Spectrum Road
Steve Swallow
Robert Walter
Bobby Watson
Matt Wilson

References

External links
Official website

American record labels
Jazz record labels